Cuba Mills is an unincorporated community in Juniata County, Pennsylvania, United States.

References

Unincorporated communities in Juniata County, Pennsylvania
Unincorporated communities in Pennsylvania